Gary U.S. Bonds (born Gary Levone Anderson, June 6, 1939) is an American rhythm and blues and rock and roll singer, known for his hits "New Orleans" and "Quarter to Three".

Career
Born in Jacksonville, Florida, Bonds lived in Norfolk, Virginia, in the 1950s when he began singing publicly in church and with a group called the Turks. He joined record producer Frank Guida's small Legrand Records label where Guida chose Anderson's stage name, U.S. Bonds, in hopes that it would be confused with a public service announcement advertising the sale of government bonds and thereby garner more DJ attention. His first three singles and first album, Dance 'Til Quarter to Three, were released under the U.S. Bonds name, but people assumed it was the name of a group. To avoid confusion, subsequent releases, including his second album Twist Up Calypso, were made under the name Gary (U.S.) Bonds. The parentheses were discarded in the 1970s.

"Quarter to Three" sold one million records, earning a gold disc. Subsequent hits, under his modified name, included "School Is Out" (#5), "Dear Lady Twist" (#9), "School Is In" (#28) and "Twist, Twist Senora" (#9) in the early 1960s. In a 1963 tour of Europe, he headlined above the Beatles. His hits featured solos by the saxophonist Gene Barge.

"Quarter to Three" appears on The Rock and Roll Hall of Fame's 500 Songs that Shaped Rock and Roll list.

In the early 1980s, Bonds had a career resurgence with two albums recorded with Bruce Springsteen, Steven Van Zandt, and the E Street Band. Dedication was released in 1981, and On the Line followed in 1982. The albums spawned several hits including "This Little Girl" (his comeback hit in 1981, which reached No. 11 on the pop chart in Billboard and No. 5 on the mainstream rock chart), "Jolé Blon" and "Out of Work".

While Bonds is mostly known for achievements within rhythm and blues and rock and roll, he often transcends these genres; for example, his song "She's All I Got", co-written by Jerry Williams, Jr. (better known as Swamp Dogg), was nominated for the Country Music Association's "Song of the Year" in 1972 when it was a big hit for Johnny Paycheck (Freddie North also charted his only pop hit with a soul cover of the same song). He is also a 1997 honoree of the Rhythm & Blues Foundation. Bonds is an accomplished golfer and often plays celebrity PGA Tour events.

Bonds released an album in 2004 called Back in 20, the title referencing his repeated sporadic pop-ups of popularity (his first hits were in the 1960s, then again in the 1980s, and now another significant album in the early 2000s, each 20-odd years apart). The album features guest appearances by Springsteen and Southside Johnny.

In 2009, he released a new album, Let Them Talk, and toured the UK as a special guest of Bill Wyman's Rhythm Kings. Most recently, in 2010, Bonds contributed duet vocals on the song "Umbrella in My Drink" on Southside Johnny's album Pills and Ammo.

Discography

Studio albums

Singles

References

External links

 

1939 births
20th-century African-American male singers
21st-century African-American male singers
African-American rock musicians
African-American rock singers
African-American songwriters
American male singer-songwriters
American rhythm and blues singer-songwriters
American rhythm and blues singers
American rock singers
American rock songwriters
American session musicians
Bill Wyman's Rhythm Kings members
Laurie Records artists
Living people
Musicians from Jacksonville, Florida
Musicians from Norfolk, Virginia
People from Norfolk, Virginia
Razor & Tie artists
Singer-songwriters from Florida
Singer-songwriters from Virginia
Sue Records artists